The 1982 Galerie Dominique Artists season was the eighth season of the franchise in the Philippine Basketball Association (PBA). Known as Mariwasa-Honda TMXers in the Reinforced Filipino Conference.

Transactions

Summary
Mariwasa-Honda won their first two games of the season, returning import James Robinson scored 34 points as Mariwasa-Honda pulled an opening day upset win against last year’s losing finalists U/Tex Wranglers, 97-95.  The TMXers scored another surprise win in their next outing against Toyota, 116-100. Mariwasa-Honda lost a chance to forge a tie with U/Tex Wranglers for the last quarterfinals berth when they bowed to Gilbey's Gin, 116–122, on the final playing date of the elimination phase on June 8.
 
The team change its name to Galerie Dominique in the Open Conference. The Artists scored their first win after four losses on September 12, defeating the Crispa Redmanizers, 114-107, with new import 6–9 Micah Blunt replacing the injured James Robinson.  Blunt team up with Kenny Barnes for the rest of the conference. The Artists won only three out of 18 games in the eliminations and ended up last.

Won-loss records vs Opponents

Reinforced All-Filipino Conference roster

Open Conference roster

References

Galerie Dominique Artists
Galerie